The 1993–94 season was the third season in the history of Newcastle Breakers. It was also the third season in the National Soccer League. In addition to the domestic league, they also participated in the NSL Cup. Newcastle Breakers finished 12th in their National Soccer League season, and were eliminated in the NSL Cup first round by Marconi Fairfield.

Players

Competitions

Overview

National Soccer League

League table

Results summary

Results by round

Matches

NSL Cup

Statistics

Appearances and goals
Players with no appearances not included in the list.

Clean sheets

References

Newcastle Breakers FC seasons